Arizpe (or Arispe) is a small town and the municipal seat of the Arizpe Municipality in the north of the Mexican state of Sonora. It is located at 30°20'"N 110°09'"W. The area of the municipality is 2,806.78 sq.km.  The population in 2005 was 2,959 of which 1,743 lived in the municipal seat as of the 2000 census.

History
The region of Arizpe was occupied by the Opata people.  The name Arizpe is a Basque word "Aritzpe"((H)Aritz meaning Oak and Pe meaning under) and translates to "Under the Oaks".

Arizpe was founded in 1646 by the Jesuit missionary Jerónimo de la Canal, with one of the Spanish missions in the Sonoran Desert.

Provincias Internas

In 1776 Arizpe was made the capital of the Spanish colonial Comandancia y Capitanía General de las Provincias Internas. As the capital, Arizpe became a city by the end of the eighteenth century, the first in the Sonora region.

The Provincias Internas had jurisdiction over the provinces of: Sonora and Sinaloa (present day Sonora and Sinaloa, Nueva Vizcaya (present day Durango and Chihuahua), Las Californias (present day Baja California Peninsula and California), Nueva Vizcaya and Santa Fe de Nuevo México (present day New Mexico), Los Tejas (present day Texas), New Kingdom of León (present day Nuevo Leon), Nuevo Santander (present day Tamaulipas and southern Texas), and Coahuila in Nueva Extremadura (present-day Coahuila and Texas south of Nueces River).

Juan Bautista de Anza
In 1775 an overland expedition, led by Captain Juan Bautista de Anza, of colonial soldiers, missionaries, and settlers was approved by the King of Spain, for a more direct land route to and further colonization of Spanish Alta California. The De Anza Expedition reached San Francisco Bay in 1776, where de Anza located sites for the Presidio of San Francisco and Mission San Francisco de Asis (in present-day San Francisco, California).

Juan Bautista de Anza died in 1788 and is buried in Arizpe, at the Church of Nuestra Señora de la Asunción de Arizpe. In 1963, with the participation of delegations from the University of California, Berkeley and UC San Francisco, he was disinterred and reburied in a new marble memorial mausoleum at the same church.

Economy
Agriculture is the main economic activity, with farms lying in the valley of the Sonora River. Most of the crops are grasses used for the raising of cattle. There were over 40,000 head in 2000.

Tourist attractions
The municipal seat has a church and gardens with palm trees. The main church, Templo de Nuestra Señora de la Asunción, was built around 1756 and preserves retablos with oil paintings of saints and wooden and plaster sculptures.

See also
Municipalities of Sonora

References

Other sources
Enciclopedia de los Municipios de México
Inegi

External links
Arizpe, Ayuntamiento Digital (Official Website of Arizpe, Sonora)
Article on Arispe Spanish
Arizpe church English
Arizpe tourist information English

Populated places in Sonora
Populated places established in 1646
1646 establishments in the Spanish Empire